Beijing State-Owned Assets Management Co., Ltd. (BSAM) is a Chinese sovereign wealth fund based in Beijing. It was owned by Beijing Municipal People's Government.

Subsidiaries
 Beijing Beiao Group
 
 Beijing International Trust
 Beijing National Aquatics Center
 Beijing National Stadium
 China Beijing Equity Exchange
Beijing State-owned Capital Operation and Management Center, sister company

Equity investments
current
 Bank of Beijing
former
 BAIC Motor
 China Securities (Huaxia Securities) (29.82%)
 Xiezhong International (indirectly)

References

External links
  

Sovereign wealth funds
Companies based in Beijing
Companies owned by the provincial government of China
Financial services companies established in 2001
Investment companies of China